The 1998 National Hurling League (known as the Church & General National Hurling League) was the 66th season of the National Hurling League.

Division 1

The league saw a major restructuring of the usual four divisions of eight teams. Division 1 was split into Group 1A and Group 1B with each group consisting of six teams. The top two teams in each group qualified for the knock-out stage.

Limerick came into the season as defending champions of the 1997 season. Antrim, Cork, Dublin and Waterford all entered Division 1 as part of the restructuring.

On 17 May 1998, Cork won the title after a 2-14 to 0-13 win over Waterford in the final. It was their 14th league title overall and their first since 1992-93.

Cork's Joe Deane was the Division 1 top scorer with 3-30.

Division 1A table

Group stage

Division 1B table

Group stage

Knock-out stage

Semi-finals

Final

Scoring statistics

Top scorers overall

Top scorers in a single game

Division 2

The league saw a major restructuring of the usual four divisions of eight teams. Division 2 was split into Group 2A and Group 2B with each group consisting of seven teams. The top two teams in each group qualified for the knock-out stage.

Armagh, Carlow, Derry, Down, Kildare, Louth, Monaghan, Roscommon, Tyrone and Wicklow all entered Division 1 as part of the restructuring.

On 25 July 1998, Kerry won the title after a 1-11 to 2-6 win over Westmeath in a replay of the final. It was their 5th Division 2 league title overall and their first since 1967-68.

Division 2A table

Division 2B table

Knock-out stage

Semi-finals

Finals

Division 3

Knock-out stage

Final

References

League
National Hurling League seasons